The Southeastern Armed Forces Museum Military Zone 7 is a military museum located at 247 Hoang Van Thu Street, Tan Binh District, Ho Chi Minh City, Vietnam. It covers all Vietnamese resistance to foreign occupation from the Chinese occupation, the First Indochina War and the Vietnam War and the Cambodian–Vietnamese War.

The Museum's opening hours are from 07:30 to 11:30 and from 13:00 to 16:30 daily except Monday. Admission is free for Vietnamese and 40,000 VND for non-Vietnamese, plus VND 10,000 to take photos.

History
The museum was established on 5 February 1988 on the site of the former U.S. 3rd Field Hospital and is diagonally opposite the former ARVN Joint General Staff compound, now the headquarters of 7th Military Region (Vietnam People's Army).

The buildings were originally built for the American Community School in Saigon in 1958/9, however when US dependents were ordered to leave South Vietnam in February 1965, the vacated buildings became available for use by the 3rd Field Hospital. The hospital was conveniently located near to Tan Son Nhut Air Base allowing for transfer of casualties within South Vietnam and the medical evacuation of casualties to other US hospital facilities in the Pacific.

Exhibits
The museum comprises two main sections: an outdoor display of large military equipment and a military museum.

Outdoor display
 
Items on display comprise:
M-30 122mm howitzer
M41 tank
M48A3 tank
M107 Self-Propelled Gun
M113 armoured personnel carrier
M114 155 mm howitzer
T-54 tank
 model of the Tet Offensive attack on the U.S. Embassy

Military Museum
Displays include:
memorials to the leaders and heroes of the Zone 7 Military
model of several rooms in the Cu Chi Tunnels

See also

Vietnam People's Air Force Museum, Ho Chi Minh City
War Remnants Museum

References

Vietnam War museums
Military and war museums in Vietnam
Museums in Ho Chi Minh City
Communist propaganda